Norman Coleman may refer to:

Norm Coleman (born 1949), United States Senator from Minnesota
Norman Jay Coleman (1827 – 1911), United States Secretary of Agriculture under President Grover Cleveland in 1889